The SOB Traverso, designated RABe 526, is a passenger articulated trainset manufactured by Stadler Rail for Südostbahn, a railway company in Switzerland. It is a derivative of the Stadler FLIRT and began entering service in 2019. Südostbahn employs the Traversos on long-distance routes such as the Voralpen-Express and the  services over the traditional Gotthard railway.

History 
Südostbahn (SOB) ordered six eight-car trainsets from Stadler Rail in June 2016, as part of an  order that also included five four-car trainsets for use on local services. Südostbahn ordered eleven more eight-car trainsets in December 2017 to operate two InterRegio routes, dubbed , that would use the traditional route over the Gotthard railway. Under an agreement with Swiss Federal Railways, SOB would assume the operation of these services with the December 2020 timetable change. Altogether the three orders cost .

As planned, the first Traversos began operation in December 2019 on the Voralpen-Express. The trains were painted in a copper livery that according to SOB symbolized "the historical development of human society." SOB began running Traversos on the Aare Linth in December 2021.

Design 
Each formation is composed of eight cars, with a normal seating capacity of 359.

Traversos have both first- and second-class seating, 68 of the former and 291 of the latter. There are also 21 seats that can fold out for additional capacity. Vending machines provide on-board catering.

References

External links 

 SOB-Flotte 

Stadler Rail multiple units
Multiple units of Switzerland
Train-related introductions in 2019
15 kV AC multiple units